The High Sheriff of Kilkenny City was the Sovereign's judicial representative in the city of the City of Kilkenny. Initially, an office for lifetime, assigned by the Sovereign, the High Sheriff became annually appointed from the Provisions of Oxford in 1258. Besides his judicial importance, he had ceremonial and administrative functions and executed High Court Writs.

High Sheriffs of Kilkenny City
1334–1340: John Talbot
1407: Matthew Lappyng
1585: Thomas Cantwell 
1752: Edward Jollie
1813–1817: John Keogh; Henry Anderson  (served for 20 years)
1835–1838: Benjamin Barton 
1840–1842: Benjamin Barton 
1843–1844: Sir John Blunden, 3rd Baronet
1845: John M'Craith, of Kilkenny.
1848: George Reade of Kilkenny 
1849: John Newport Green of Lakeaview 
1850: Richard Smithwick, of Birchfield, Kilkenny.
1853: John Wade
1854: Thomas Hart 
1856: Edward Mulhallan of Seville Lodge, Kilkenny  
1858: George P. Helsham of John Street, Kilkenny 
1862: Thomas Power
1867: D. Cullen  
1869: James Sullivan 
1870: James Smithwick of Drakeland 
 Joseph Empson 
 John F. Smithwick  
 Edmond Smithwick  
1881: Richard Colles, of Millmount
1883: Simon Morris  
1884: Patrick Murphy 
1886: Edward Fennessy

References

Kilkenny City
Kilkenny (city)